Law or Loyalty is a 1926 silent film directed by Lawson Harris. It was set in Canada.

Cast
Lawson Harris as Pierre Santol
Richard Sutherland as the Timber Wolf
David French
Dolores Dorian

References

External links

1926 films
American black-and-white films
American silent feature films
1926 adventure films
American adventure films
1920s American films
Silent adventure films
1920s English-language films